The Trezona Formation is a Neoproterozoic epoch fossiliferous geological formation in South Australia.

See also

References 

Geologic formations of Australia
Precambrian Australia
Neoproterozoic geology
Geology of South Australia
Paleontology in South Australia